The Innovator Mosquito Air is a Canadian helicopter produced by Innovator Technologies of Rockyview, Alberta. The aircraft is supplied as a kit for amateur construction.

Design and development
It features a single main rotor and tail rotor, a single-seat open cockpit without a windshield, skid landing gear and a two-cylinder, air-cooled, two-stroke  Zanzottera MZ 202 engine.

The aircraft fuselage is made from bolted-together 6061-T6 aluminium tubing, with a carbon fibre tail boom and support struts. The cyclic control is routed via the centre of the rotor mast and the main rotor transmission is a poly "V" belt.

Reviewer Werner Pfaendler describes the design as "simple, but intelligent and reliable".

The Mosquito Air is the basis for the enclosed cockpit Mosquito XE.

Specifications (Mosquito Air)

See also
List of rotorcraft

References

External links

Mosquito Air
Homebuilt aircraft
Canadian helicopters
Single-engined piston helicopters